Termessa congrua is a moth in the subfamily Arctiinae. It was described by Francis Walker in 1865. It is found in Australia, where it has been recorded from New South Wales and Queensland.

References

Moths described in 1865
Lithosiini